ZagrebDox is an international documentary film festival taking place in Zagreb every year, in late February / early March. Launched in 2005, the festival is intended to provide audiences and experts insight into recent documentary films, stimulate national documentary production and boost international and regional cooperation in co-productions. ZagrebDox is a specialised festival that presents the best creative documentary films whose imaginative form and choice of topics make it unique in Croatia and Europe.

The festival's competition program has international and regional categories. The international competition presents the best auteur and creative documentary films from the world made and produced in the past year, with a focus on everything that is new, brave, off mainstream and intrepid. The regional competition program consists of the films from Albania, Austria, Bosnia and Herzegovina, Bulgaria, Croatia, Hungary, Italy, Kosovo, North Macedonia, Montenegro, Romania, Slovenia and Serbia. The fact that ZagrebDox lays great stress on the regional program makes it additionally attractive for all those who want to look into the latest regional production.

Besides the competition program, ZagrebDox has a number of non-competition programs – retrospectives and films focused on specific subjects, genres, techniques and aesthetics.

Essential part of the festival is ZagrebDox Pro, a training programme consisting of a preparatory workshop for creative documentary projects in different stages of development and production, a Pitching Forum and individual meetings. The four-day workshop is tailored for professional director/producer teams. In some cases, teams can also be joined by the screenwriter, cinematographer or editor, but a director and/or a producer must be present.

The festival is organised by a Zagreb-based film production company Factum, and is usually held in February. As of 2019, the festival has featured more than 2,000 films, which were seen by approximately 290,000 visitors.

Awards 
Prizes are awarded in the following categories:

Official Awards 
Big Stamp Award (Veliki pečat) : for Best Film in International Competition Programme

Big Stamp Award (Veliki pečat) : for Best Film in Regional Competition Programme

Little Stamp Award (Mali pečat): for Best Film by a young author of up to 35 years of age

HT Audience Award: for Best Film Audience Choice

Special Awards 
Movies that Matter Award: for film that best promotes human rights

Teen Dox Award: for best film about issues concerning the young. The award is given by a special jury consisting of male and female students from a single high school

FIPRESCI Award: or best film in Regional Competition

The award of the International Federation of Film Critics – FIPRESCI Fédération Internationale de la Presse Cinématographique, the oldest and most prestigious film critics association, with members from around fifty countries. The award is of great importance among film authors.

My Generation Award: The award for a film by My Generation filmmaker is an award dedicated to those filmmakers who have, often in a quiet and unassuming manner, achieved great quality of work and whose presence has been crucial to documentary film for years, even decades. The filmmakers without whom there would be no documentary film. Awarded by Nenad Puhovski, the founder and Director of ZagrebDox.

The awards (except the special ones) include a statue and a diploma. The Festival Jury can also award Special Mentions consisting of a diploma.

Award winners

International competition

Regional competition

Best Young Director

Audience Award

Lifetime Achievement Award
 (The Lifetime Achievement Award (Počasni pečat) was introduced at the 2009 edition, for outstanding contribution to documentary filmmaking)

 Bogdan Žižić (2009)
 Jon Alpert (2009)

Special awards 
Apart from the regular categories, the festival sometimes awards special prizes, often related to themes of a particular festival edition.

References

Film festivals in Croatia
Documentary film festivals in Croatia
Culture in Zagreb
2005 establishments in Croatia
Film festivals established in 2005
Winter events in Croatia